Jaromír Tarabus (born 21 March 1977) is one of the Czech top rally drivers (3rd overall in Czech rally Championship in 2010, 2012 and 2013. Title in group N 2006. Titles in class N2 in 2001, 2003, 2005. Title in class N1 in 2000). He used to race in the PWRC in the 2008 and 2009 season.

Co-drivers:
2006-2010, 2012-2013: Daniel Trunkát (born also 21 March 1971). Daniel Trunkát also acts as main team manager (2006-2013). Rally-crew Tarabus-Trunkát is well known also as "T&T".

2000-2004: Igor Norek (born 26 November 1977)

2005: Václav Vorel

Complete WRC results

PWRC results

IRC results

European Rally Championship (ERC) results

* Season still in progress

Czech Rally Championship results

Czech Sprintrally Championship results

External links 
 eWRC-results.com profile
 Official website

1977 births
Place of birth missing (living people)
Czech rally drivers
Living people
World Rally Championship drivers
European Rally Championship drivers
Sportspeople from Zlín